Vincent Aind is an Indian prelate of the Roman Catholic Church, serving as the bishop of the Roman Catholic Diocese of Bagdogra, India since 2015.

Early life and education 
He was born on 30 January 1955 at Kalchini, West Bengal. He completed his bachelor's degree in economics from St. Joseph's College, Darjeeling. He has a degree in philosophy from Morning Star Regional Seminary, Barrackpore. He holds a Licentiate in Philosophy from Jnana-Deepa and a Doctorate in Philosophy from the Pontifical Gregorian University. He completed his studies in theology at St. Joseph's Seminary, Mangalore.

He was ordained a priest on 30 April 1984.

Episcopate 
He was appointed Bishop of the Roman Catholic Diocese of Bagdogra on 7 April 2015 by Pope Francis and consecrated on 14 June by Telesphore Toppo.

He is a Consultant and Member of the Diocesan Council for Economic Affairs of the Roman Catholic Diocese of Jalpaiguri and Regional Secretary of the Commission of the Clergy, Religious and Seminarians of the Regional Episcopal Conference of West Bengal. He is a member of the Editorial Team and Executive Committee of the Association of Christian Philosophers of India.

References 

Living people
1955 births
People from West Bengal
Pontifical Gregorian University alumni
21st-century Roman Catholic bishops in India
Bishops appointed by Pope Francis
Indian expatriates in Italy